The 2019 IFSC Climbing World Cup was held in 12 locations. Bouldering, lead and speed competitions were each held in 6 locations. The season began on 5 April in Meiringen, Switzerland with the first bouldering competition in the season, and concluded on 27 October in Inzai, Japan, with the last lead climbing competition in the season.

The top 3 in each competition received medals, and the overall winners were awarded trophies. At the end of the season an overall ranking was determined based upon points, which athletes were awarded for finishing in the top 30 of each individual event.

Olympic qualification 

For the Tokyo 2020 Olympics athletes can qualify through either the IFSC Combined World Championships, the Olympic Qualifying Event or the Continental Championships. The Olympic Qualifying Event is an invitation only event open to the 22 highest ranked climbers on the World Cup circuit who haven't already qualified.

Highlights of the season 
In bouldering, at the World Cup in Moscow, Janja Garnbret of Slovenia flashed all boulders in the final round to take the win.
At the World Cup in Vail, Garnbret won her sixth consecutive gold medal and became the first climber ever to make a clean sweep of Bouldering World Cup season by winning six out of six events held this year. Moreover, she also became the first female climber to win overall World Cup season titles in lead (2016, 2017, 2018) and bouldering (2019). Ai Mori of Japan, in her first year of open eligibility, made her the World Cup debut in Meiringen, then won her first medal (bronze) at the World Cup in Wujiang, China.

In speed, at the World Cup in Chongqing, YiLing Song of China set a new world record of 7.101s, breaking the previous world record of 7.32s set by Iuliia Kaplina of Russia at the 2017 World Games in Wroclaw and Anouck Jaubert of France at the 2018 Speed World Cup in Moscow. At the World Cup in Xiamen, Aries Susanti Rahayu of Indonesia set a new world record of 6.995s in the final race, breaking Song's 7.101s, and becoming the first woman in the history of the sport to record a time under 7 seconds.

In lead, Chaehyun Seo of South Korea, in her first year of open eligibility, made her World Cup debut in Villars and claimed her first medal (silver) there. Then, she won the next 4 Lead World Cups and placed third in the last one, finishing her debut season with a 2019 Lead World Cup Season Champion title. Also in her debut season, Natsuki Tanii of Japan earned her first medal (bronze) in Briançon and continued her consistent performance throughout the season and thus claiming third place of the overall lead season ranking. Other notable athletes in their World Cup debut season: Ai Mori (JPN), YueTong Zhang (CHN).

Overview

Bouldering 

The overall ranking is determined based upon points, which athletes are awarded for finishing in the top 30 of each individual event. There are six competitions in the season, but only the best five attempts are counted. The national ranking is the sum of the points of that country's three best male and female athletes. Results displayed in parentheses are not counted.

Men 
The results of the ten most successful athletes of the Bouldering World Cup 2019:

Women 
The results of the ten most successful athletes of the Bouldering World Cup 2019:

* = Joint place with another athlete

National Teams 
The results of the ten most successful countries of the Bouldering World Cup 2019:

Country names as used by the IFSC

Lead 
The overall ranking is determined based upon points, which athletes are awarded for finishing in the top 30 of each individual event. There are six competitions in the season, but only the best five attempts are counted. The national ranking is the sum of the points of that country's three best male and female athletes. Results displayed in parentheses are not counted.

Men 
The results of the ten most successful athletes of the Lead World Cup 2019:

Women 
The results of the ten most successful athletes of the Lead World Cup 2019:

National Teams 
The results of the ten most successful countries of the Lead World Cup 2019:

Country names as used by the IFSC

Speed 
The overall ranking is determined based upon points, which athletes are awarded for finishing in the top 30 of each individual event. There are six competitions in the season, but only the best five attempts are counted. The national ranking is the sum of the points of that country's three best male and female athletes. Results displayed in parentheses are not counted.

Men 
The results of the ten most successful athletes of the Speed World Cup 2019:

Women 
The results of the ten most successful athletes of the Speed World Cup 2019:

National Teams 
The results of the ten most successful countries of the Lead World Cup 2019:

Country names as used by the IFSC

Combined 
The 22 highest ranked climbers on the World Cup circuit (combined) who haven't already qualified for the Olympics will be invited to the Toulouse Olympic Qualifying Event.

Men

Women

Medal table

See also 
2019 in sport climbing
2019 IFSC Climbing World Championships

References

IFSC Climbing World Cup
2019 in sport climbing